In medicine, dysthanasia means "bad death" and is considered a common fault of modern medicine.

Dysthanasia is a term generally used when a person is kept alive artificially, in a condition where otherwise they cannot survive; sometimes for some sort of ulterior motive.  Dysthanasia occurs when a person who is dying has their biological life extended through technological means without regard to the person's quality of life. Technologies such as an implantable cardioverter defibrillator, artificial ventilation, ventricular assist devices, and extracorporeal membrane oxygenation can extend the dying process. In some cases, cardiopulmonary resuscitation can be considered a form of dysthanasia.

The term was used frequently in the investigation into the death of Formula One driver Ayrton Senna in 1994. 

The etymology of the term is from the Greek language: δυσ, dus; "bad, difficult" + θάνατος, thanatos; "death".

See also
Brain death
Death with Dignity National Center
Euthanasia
Life support
Palliative care

References

Further reading

Medical aspects of death
Cultural aspects of death